Eudonia rakaiensis is a moth in the family Crambidae. It is endemic to New Zealand.

Taxonomy
This species was described by Henry Guard Knaggs in 1867 and named Scoparia rakaiensis. John S. Dugdale assigned this species to the genus Eudonia in 1988. However he misspelt the specific epithet as rakaiaensis instead of the correct rakaiensis.

References

Moths described in 1867
Eudonia
Endemic fauna of New Zealand
Moths of New Zealand
Endemic moths of New Zealand